Omoglymmius americanus, the American crudely carved wrinkle beetle, is a species of ground beetle in the subfamily Rhysodidae native to eastern North America. It was originally described by Laporte as Rhysodes americanus in 1836. The pronotum has three grooves and the elytra have numerous indentations, formed in lines. Omoglymmius americanus occur in fungus-infested trees.

References

americanus
Beetles described in 1836